Vallabhaneni Vamsi Mohan is a Member of the Legislative Assembly of Andhra Pradesh, representing Gannavaram, through Telugu Desam Party, since 2014. 

He is also a film producer in Telugu cinema. He produced two high budget films, Adhurs (2010) and Touch Chesi Chudu (2018), with Jr. NTR and Ravi Teja, respectively.

As Producer

References

External links

Living people
Andhra Pradesh MLAs 2014–2019
Politicians from Vijayawada
Telugu politicians
YSR Congress Party politicians
YSR Congress Party
Year of birth missing (living people)